Yoshi is an extinct genus of machairodontine sabertooth cat in the tribe Metailurini. Its fossils were described from Turolian deposits from the Miocene epoch of the Balkan Peninsula in 2014 and specimens from China once thought to belong to Metailurus. The name comes from that of the lead author's pet cat. It has been described as potentially being synonymous with Metailurus, though this is difficult to confirm at present. The type specimen is a skull that bears remarkable similarities with the modern cheetah. Yoshi is intermediate in size between a lynx and cougar, and based on several as-yet unpublished skeletons, may have had a similar lifestyle to the cheetah, being better built for speed and fast pursuit than most other machairodonts, which were more suited to ambush and hunting large, relatively slow moving animals.

In 2022, two new species Yoshi faie and Yoshi yongdengensis were proposed based on fossils found in northeastern China.

References

Metailurini
Miocene carnivorans
Miocene genus extinctions
Prehistoric carnivoran genera
Miocene mammals of Europe
Fossil taxa described in 2014